is a Japanese rugby union player who plays as a Flanker or Number 8. He currently plays for Suntory Sungoliath in Japan's domestic Top League.

International
Tatafu was called-up to his country's wider training squad in April 2021, ahead of British and Irish Lions test. On 24 May, he was named in the 36-man squad for the match against the Sunwolves and tour of Scotland and Ireland. He had previously made 3 appearances for Japan in 2016, debuting against Korea in the 2016 Asia Rugby Championship.

References

External links
 

1996 births
Living people
Japanese rugby union players
Rugby union flankers
Rugby union number eights
Tokyo Sungoliath players
Japan international rugby union players
21st-century Japanese people